Monoceromyia pleuralis is a hoverfly that occurs in Japan. It is mostly black with yellow markings and brown markings on its wings. It was originally described by Coquillett in 1898 as Sphiximorpha pleuralis, but that genus was later lumped into Monoceromyia by Shannon.

References

Eristalinae
Insects described in 1898

taxa named by Daniel William Coquillett